An umbrella company is a company that employs agency contractors who work on temporary contract assignments, usually through a recruitment agency in the United Kingdom. Recruitment agencies prefer to issue contracts to a limited company as the agency liability would be reduced. It issues invoices to the recruitment agency (or client) and, when payment of the invoice is made, will typically pay the contractor through PAYE with the added benefit of offsetting some of the income through claiming expenses such as travel, meals, and accommodation.

Umbrella companies have become more prevalent in the UK since the British government introduced so-called "IR35" legislation that creates tests to determine employment status and ability to make use of small company tax reliefs. According to criteria set out by the UK Department for Business, Innovation & Skills, there are an estimated 4 million temporary workers in the UK, of whom 1.56 million are "classed  as being in a management or senior official role, a professional occupation or an associate professional and technical occupation." It is estimated that 14% of the UK's professional contractors are currently managing their business by working through an umbrella company.

Structure
An umbrella company processes timesheets received from the employee/contractor, then issues an invoice to the client for payment.

An umbrella company is an employer, and so each contractor working with such a company signs a Contract of Employment, also referred to as a contract of service. This contractual arrangement delineates those rights and obligations concerning maternity pay, sick pay, employment protection. A substantial body of case law provides guidance on what constitutes a contract of service.

The umbrella company provides payroll services on behalf of the contractor and bills the agency (who in turn bills the client) for work completed by the contractor. The umbrella company provides all social contribution and tax payments (including "PAYE, Pay As You Earn" in certain jurisdictions) and equivalents and National Insurance returns on behalf of the contractor.

The client is effectively the company for whom the contractor works. This may be within any industry and across all levels of employment. The client often elects to use contractors as it affords them the ability to temporarily augment their staff or capability without the burden of the legal requirements associated with permanent employees (PAYE, NI, sick pay, insurances etc.). Using contractors also facilitates special skills and typically provides the advantage of a broader skill set, as the contractor has typically worked many companies and organizations during prior contracts.

The agency, if involved, performs the recruitment process on behalf of the client. Some agencies will provide a PAYE scheme as part of their offer.  This alleviates the requirement for the umbrella company but requires additional capability within the organization including professional accountants and adherence to fiscal laws. Most agencies elect to utilize an umbrella company.

The contractor or employee of the umbrella company completes the actual work, completes a timesheet and submits this (typically via fax or secure web portal) along with any expense claims to the umbrella company.

Expenses and taxes
All umbrella companies use the same PAYE calculations to ascertain how much tax should be paid. The only difference between umbrella companies will be the margin that they retain and the schemes they run.

Some of the most common "allowable" expenses include: mileage & general travel expenses, hotel and accommodation expenses and professional subscriptions. Food and subsistence is rarely allowed to be claimed, as it is HMRC's opinion that you would eat regardless as to whether you are working or not. The exception to this rule is if you were staying away from home as part of the work.

As an employee of an Umbrella Company you may be entitled to claim assignment related contractor expenses, if you engage in a number of assignments, based at different workplaces, during a single period of employment. If you know you will only work on a single assignment during your employment, your workplace automatically meets HMRC's definition of a permanent workplace and therefore travel and accommodation expense claims are not permitted.

The 2008 HM Treasury pre-budget report reported on the consultation on the use of travel expenses in conjunction with being employed via umbrella companies. The document questioned the validity and fairness of allowing business expenses in this form suggesting that an overarching employment contract was not a form of employment that allowed travel and subsistence expenses. HMT decided that the legislation would remain as is but suggested additional HMRC policing would be carried out to reduce cases of non-compliance. HMT issued the results of the consultation in December 2008.

Supervision, Direction and Control (SDC) came into effect on 6 April 2016 as a way of limiting the number of umbrella contractors being able to claim travel and subsistence expenses. As a whole, tax relief is not available for home-to-work travel and related subsistence to workers in a permanent role. This is, as of April 2016, the same for contractors working through umbrella companies.

Benefits
Umbrella companies broadly provide two sets of benefits to contractors. a) Standard set of Statutory Payments like Statutory Sick Pay (SSP), Statutory Maternity Pay (SMP), Holiday Pay etc.   b) Other employment life style benefits like Clinical counseling, Legal Support, Dependent Care, Critical incident support

Charges 
Umbrella companies normally keep a part of the income or charge a margin for processing contractors' payroll and for some umbrella companies it will go towards contractors insurances. In France, Belgium and Sweden, it is usually a percentage of the invoiced amount. In the UK, it is mostly a fixed weekly amount.

International links 
The American professional employer organization PEO (Professional Employers Organization) offering co-employment for small companies.

Notes

References
hmrc.gov.uk, employment status
hmrc.gov.uk, MSC guidance July 2007 (PDF)
hmrc.gov.uk, dispensation
hm-treasury.gov.uk, consult travel expenses
hmrc.gov.uk, calcs/paye
hmrc.gov.uk, paye/exb intro dispensation

Types of business entity
Legal entities